Hemimenia is a genus of solenogasters, shell-less, worm-like mollusks.

References

Neomeniamorpha